Campbellton is a small lumbering and fishing community located on the island of Newfoundland at Indian Arm, Notre Dame Bay. The community was originally named Indian Arm due to a Beothuk village located on the nearby Indian Arm River. It was renamed to Campbellton in honor of the sawmill manager John Campbell.

Demographics 

See also
List of cities and towns in Newfoundland and Labrador

References

Populated coastal places in Canada
Towns in Newfoundland and Labrador